Myrtle Witbooi was a South African labour activist. She currently serves as the General secretary of the South African Domestic Service and Allied Workers Union (SADSAWU). She also serves the first president of the International Domestic Workers Federation (IDWF), a membership-based global organization of household and domestic workers. Labor scholars have noted IDWF is the "first international labor federation run by women for work dominated by women." In January 2023, she lost her battle with cancer, dying after a valiant and brave fight with the disease.

Career 
In 1960s, Myrtle began her career as a young domestic worker in apartheid South Africa. With the help of a local journalist, she helped convene the first ever organisational meeting of domestic workers in Cape Town in 1965. As General Secterary of SADSAWU, she has fought for a national minimum wage increase and compensation for on-the-job injuries for domestic workers. In 2011, Myrtle helped lead the international coalition of domestic workers that secured passage of the International Labor Organization (ILO) Convention on Decent Work for Domestic Workers (C. 189). The Convention (No. 189) on domestic workers has become the first international labor standard to ensure domestic workers the same basic rights as other workers.  As part of SADSAWU, Myrtle played a central role in influencing the ILO Domestic Workers Convention C.189. The convention marked unprecedented involvement of informal women workers in the ILO standard-setting process.

In 2013, Myrtle accepted the George Meany–Lane Kirkland Human Rights Award, which recognizes international leaders and organizations who have overcome significant hurdles to fight for human rights.

In 2015, Myrtle was awarded 2015 Fairness Award, which honors outstanding leaders who dedicates themselves to bring economic justice, fairness and equality to the poor and marginalized communities.

References 

South African labour law
South African activists
South African women activists
Living people
1947 births